Planorbella is a genus of freshwater air-breathing snails, aquatic pulmonate gastropod mollusks in the family Planorbidae, the ram's horn snails, or planorbids, which all have sinistral, or left-coiling, shells.

Ecology
Species in this genus are sometimes hosts for parasites, constituting a link in the pathway of infection for higher animals. For example, some species of Planorbella host rediae and cercariae stages of the parasite Ribeiroia, prior to ultimate infection of the Rough-skinned Newt.

Planorbella are often algae grazers, and in some locations such as oligotrophic sloughs, they may be a dominant element of total ecosystem biomass and hence system integrity.

Species
Species within the genus Planorbella include:
 Planorbella ammon (Gould, 1855)
 Planorbella binneyi (Tryon, 1867)
 Planorbella campanulata (Say, 1821)
 Planorbella columbiensis (F. C. Baker, 1945)
 Planorbella corpulenta (Say, 1824)
 Planorbella duryi (Wetherby, 1879)
 Planorbella magnifica (Pilsbry, 1903)
 † Planorbella multivolvis (Case, 1847)
 Planorbella occidentalis (J. G. Cooper, 1870)
 Planorbella oregonensis (Tryon, 1865)
 Planorbella pilsbryi (F. C. Baker, 1926)
 Planorbella scalaris (Jay, 1839)
 Planorbella subcrenata (Carpenter, 1857)
 Planorbella tenuis (Dunker, 1850)
 Planorbella traski (I. Lea, 1856)
 Planorbella trivolvis (Say, 1817)
 Planorbella truncata (M. Miles, 1861)

References

External links

 
Taxa named by Samuel Stehman Haldeman